Svinařov is a municipality and village in Kladno District in the Central Bohemian Region of the Czech Republic. It has about 800 inhabitants.

Etymology
The name was most likely derived from cattle breeding or wine growing for the needs of the nearby gord of Libušín.

Geography
It is situated in a valley surrounded by forested slopes, fields and meadows. The eastern part of the municipality lies in the Prague Plateau, the western part lies in the geomorphological region of Džbán.

History
The first written mention of Svinařov is from 1328, when the village was sold by Bořita of Ředhošt to the Vyšehrad Chapter. It is probable that there was some kind of settlement much earlier thanks to an archaeological research carried out in a nearby town of Libušín which proved that the area was inhabited in the 6th–7th centuries. The existence of Svinařov was closely connected with the gord of Libušín. Svinařov served as a supplier of agricultural products to the gord.

There was a fortress built around 1330. The owner of Svinařov, Vyšehrad Chapter, used to hire out the Svinařov to different tenants till the reign of Wenceslaus IV of Bohemia, when the village was sold. Some years later it became a part of property of the Smečno's noble Martinic family and it remained so until the 19th century. The family of Martinic gradually became one of the richest and most powerful noble families in the Czech kingdom. In 1885, Svinařov village separated from Libušín and became a sovereign municipality.

Most people there earned their living in agriculture, but this changed in the second half of the 19th century with the discovery of coal in the region. Many people from all around the country started to move in and the village started to expand. Most people were therefore employed in the coal industry until the mines closed down in 2002.

Transport
Svinařov is connected with the nearby municipalities by bus.

Notable people
Václav Mrázek (1925–1957), serial killer

References

External links

Villages in Kladno District